Ngumbin (or Ngumpin) languages are a small language family of Australia, consisting of (from west to east):

Walmajarri
Djaru
Gurindji (Gurindji proper, Bilinarra, Wanyjirra, Malngin, Ngarinyman)
Mudburra

In 2004 it was demonstrated that Ngumbin is related to the neighboring Ngarrkic languages.

See also
Ngumpit, a name used by the Gurindji, Malngin, Bilinara, Mudburra and Ngarinyman peoples to refer to themselves as a group

Footnotes

References
McConvell and Laughren (2004) "The Ngumpin–Yapa subgroup". In Claire Bowern & Harold Koch, Australian Languages: Classification and the Comparative Method. Amsterdam/Philadelphia: John Benjamins Publishing Company.

 
Indigenous Australian languages in Western Australia
Indigenous Australian languages in the Northern Territory